Lisa von Lübeck is a reconstruction of a 15th-century Kraweel, which is based in Lübeck, Germany.

History

The reconstruction of a sailing ship used by the Hanseatic League started 1999 as a social project in Lübeck's harbour. The ship was launched in 2004. In 2005 she made her first voyage on the Baltic Sea.

Both vessels put into Den Helder. On 12 June 2015, she collided with the ro-ro cargo ship  on the Trave off Travemünde. She lost her bowsprit in the accident.

References

External links

 Lisa von Lübeck

Sailing ships of Germany
Replica ships
2004 ships
Port of Lübeck
Ships built in Lübeck
Maritime incidents in 2013
Maritime incidents in 2015